Telediario (Tele-journal) is the flagship television newscast produced by Televisión Española (TVE), the television division of Spanish state-owned public broadcaster Radiotelevisión Española (RTVE). It is the longest running program in the history of television in Spain as it has been broadcast daily since 15 September 1957.

Three Telediario editions a day are produced by Televisión Española news services and are simulcast live on La 1, on 24 Horas news channel, on TVE Internacional and on RTVE Play. Previous editions are also available on their online platform on demand. Additional international editions are also produced and aired on TVE Internacional every day.

TVE's territorial centers in every autonomous community produce and broadcast in regional variations in each of them, a shorter midday local newscast, each one with a different name, following the format and visual identity of Telediario.

History
Televisión Española was established at a building of Paseo de la Habana in Madrid and began its broadcasts on 28 October 1956. Within a week, the news services were created and its initial newscast, named Últimas Noticias, began broadcast; with the weather forecast first airing on 2 November 1956. This initial newscast only lasted until that summer break. On 15 September 1957, the evening edition of Telediario was premiered, with the afternoon edition following on 28 April 1958.

On 14 July 1959, TVE opened its Miramar studios in Barcelona and on 12 February 1964, its production center in the Canary Islands. When Prado del Rey was inaugurated on 18 July 1964 in Pozuelo de Alarcón (Madrid), the production of shows and fiction was soon transferred to the new facilities and the news services fully occupied the Paseo de la Habana premises. They were there until they were also transferred to Prado del Rey in 1967.

In August 1966, TVE stationed its first permanent foreign correspondent in London, followed in 1968 by the ones in New York, Vienna and Brussels. On 24 May 1971, the first delegation was opened in Bilbao, followed by the ones in Santiago de Compostela on 25 July 1971 and in Seville on 29 July 1971, which would later become the first territorial centers. In 1975 it started its broadcasts in color.

On 13 November 1983, the last Telediario from Prado del Rey was broadcast, as TVE's news services were moved to the new Torrespaña facilities in Madrid at the foot of the communications tower. On 14 November, Telediario was broadcast from Torrespaña for the first time, and it has been broadcast from there ever since.

On 14 July 1989, it was presented out-of-studio for the first time. It was partially presented live from the Champ de Mars in Paris, with the Eiffel Tower in the background, on the occasion of the celebrations for the bicentennial of the French Revolution. Since then, the main presenters have anchored on location on special occasions or when major stories break.

On 11 September 2001, Telediario 1 began with the breaking live feed of the World Trade Center's North Tower in New York since it had been hit a few minutes before. That edition ran for more than seven hours, making it the longest Telediario news bulletin in its history.

Many presenters and correspondents have worked for Telediario. Letizia Ortiz Rocasolano was an anchor for three years (2000–2003), just until the day before the unexpected announcement of her engagement with then Prince of Asturias Felipe de Borbón. Writer Arturo Pérez-Reverte was a TVE war correspondent for twenty-one years (1973–1994) and chronicled, among others, the Bosnian war. Rosa María Mateo was an anchor for twenty years (1973–1993). Ana Blanco served as anchor for thirty-two years, from 15 September 1990 until she stepped down on 29 August 2022.

In 2019, a plan to transfer TVE's news services and Telediario back to Prado del Rey starting in late 2021 was approved. This plan was eventually halted due to the COVID-19 pandemic and was replaced by another plan to modernize the facilities in Torrespaña.

Programme format
The programme is presented by one or two main newsreaders with an additional sports news presenter. News items are produced, with the footage taken by their own cameramen, by the central newsroom of TVE's news services in Torrespaña, by the newsrooms of TVE's territorial centers across Spain, by TVE's foreign correspondents around the world or by on-the-scene special reporters. All the news feeds are coordinated by TVE's news services' master control room in Torrespaña. Additional footage can be taken from the TVE historical audiovisual archive, from the Eurovision news exchange service or from news agencies. Many items are preceded by the journalist reporting live (Directo) from the scene of the story. The sixty-minute programme is followed by a weather report known as El Tiempo, produced by RTVE's meteorological service with data from the State Meteorological Agency. The entire running time, including El Tiempo, is about seventy minutes.

Sirún Demirjián and Álex Barreiro present Telediario Matinal, the breakfast edition consisting of a rolling news service that airs for two hours from 06:30 CET/CEST, with Rubén Briones presenting the sports. Alejandra Herranz presents Telediario 1, the afternoon edition at 15:00, with Lourdes García Campos presenting the sports. Carlos Franganillo presents Telediario 2, the flagship evening edition at 21:00, with Arsenio Cañada presenting the sports. Lara Siscar and Igor Gómez present Telediario Fin de Semana, the weekend editions at 15:00 and 21:00, with Marcos López presenting the sports.

All Telediario editions provide closed captioning, and the 24 Horas news channel simulcast include sign language interpretation during the bulletins.

List of presenters (current) 
Telediario Matinal (Monday to Friday, 06:30 CET/CEST)
 Presenter: Sirún Demirjián and Álex Barreiro
 Sports commentator: Rubén Briones

Telediario 1 (Monday to Friday, 15:00 CET/CEST)
 Presenter: Alejandra Herranz
 Sports commentator: Lourdes García Campos

Telediario 2 (Monday to Friday, 21:00 CET/CEST)
 Presenter: Carlos Franganillo
 Sports commentator: Arsenio Cañada

Telediario Fin de Semana (Saturday and Sunday, 15:00 and 21:00 CET/CEST)
 Presenter: Lara Siscar and Igor Gómez
 Sports commentator: Marcos López

List of presenters (former) 

 Adela Cantalapiedra (1978–1985)
 Alberto Delgado (1971–1983)
 Alfredo Urdaci (1998–2004)
 Almudena Ariza (1990–1991, 1994, 1996–1998)
 Ana Blanco (1990–2022)
 Ana Roldán (2006–2012; currently relief presenter)
 Ana Rosa Quintana (1982–1983)
 Andrés Aberasturi (1988)
 Ángeles Caso (1985–1987)
 Anna Castells (1989–1990)
 Antonio Martín Benítez (1991–1997)
 Baltasar Magro (1983)
 Beatriz Pérez-Aranda (2003)
 Blanca Álvarez (1958–1970)
 Blanca Gala (1968–1969)
 Carlos Herrera Crusset (1985)
 Carmen Tomás (2000–2004)
 César Macía (1999–2000)
 Clara Isabel Francia (1975–1977)
 Concha García Campoy (1985–1987)
 Cristina García Ramos (1979–1983)
 David Cantero (2004–2010)
 David Cubedo (1957–1965)
 Eduardo Sancho (1956–1966)
 Eduardo Sotillos (1976–1978, 1995–1996)
 Elena Sánchez (1987–1993, 2004–2006)
 Ernesto Sáenz de Buruaga (1996–1998)
 Felipe Mellizo (1984–1985)
 Fernando González Delgado (1993–1996)
 Florencio Solchaga (1971–1975)
 Francine Gálvez (1990–1991)
 Francisco Lobatón (1985–1987)
 Helena Resano (2003–2006)
 Igor Gómez (2000–2006)
 Iñaki Gabilondo (1981)
 Isabel Tenaille (1987)
 Javier Vázquez (1973–1975)
 Jesús Álvarez (1957–1967)
 Jesús Hermida (1990–1991)
 Joaquín Arozamena (1981–1984)
 José Miguel Flores (1978–1979)
 José Ribagorda (1997–2004)
 Josep María Balcells (1991–1992)
 Josep Puigbó (2003–2004)
 Julio César Fernández (1968–1970)
 Ladislao Azcona (1976–1977)
 Letizia Ortiz (2003)
 Lluís Guilera (2018–2020)
 Lorenzo Milá (2004–2009)
 Luis Carandell (1985–1987)
 Luis de Benito (1987–1988)
 Luis Mariñas (1987–1990)
 Manuel Almendros (1976–1977)
 Manuel Campo Vidal (1983–1987)
 Mari Carmen García Vela (1975–1978, 1981–1983)
 María Casado (2006–2012)
 María José Molina (2000–2004)
 María Pau Domínguez (1989–1990)
 María San Juan (1988)
 Matías Prats Luque (1991–1998)
 Miguel Adrover (1989–1990)
 Montserrat Balfegó (1993–1995)
 Nieves Romero (1976–1977)
 Paco Montesdeoca (1984)
 Pedro Altares (1993–1995)
 Pedro Macía (1973–1980)
 Pedro Meyer (1974–1981)
 Pedro Piqueras (1988–1993)
 Pedro Sánchez Quintana (1996–1999)
 Pepa Bueno (2009–2012)
 Pepe Navarro (1984)
 Oriol Nolis (2013–2014)
 Ramón Pellicer (1993–1996)
 Ramón Sánchez Ocaña (1972–1975)
 Ricardo Fernández Deu (1976–1977)
 Rosa María Artal (1983)
 Rosa María Mateo (1973–1993)
 Sandra Sutherland (1994–1997)
 Santiago Vázquez (1961–1973)
 Secundino González (1987)
 Susana Roza (2004–2012)
 Tello Zurro (1978–1985)
 Teresa Castanedo (1988–1989)
 Victoria Prego (1981–1982)

Sports commentators 

 Jesús Álvarez Cervantes (1989–2013)
 María Escario (1985–2014)
 Mari Carmen Izquierdo (1979–1983)
 Miguel Ors (1973–1978)
 J. J. Santos (1997–2002)
 Sergio Sauca (1990–2020)
 Miguel Vila (1975–1979)
 Olga Viza (1987–1992)

Reporters and correspondents 

 Almudena Ariza (2000–present)
 Alvaro López de Goicoechea Nalda (2008–present)
 Ángela Rodicio (1989–2003)
 Anna Bosch (1998–present)
 Antonio Parreño (2005–present)
 Arturo Pérez-Reverte (1985–1994)
 Carlos Franganillo (2008–present)
 Diego Carcedo (1977–1988)
 Jesús Hermida (1967–1978)
 Julio Bernárdez (1990–1996)
 Luis de Benito (1994–2008)
 Lorenzo Milá (2003 2004 2009, −2014 )
 Miguel Angel García Rodríguez (2007–present)
 Miguel Ángel Idigoras (2013–present)
 María Serén (2013–present)
 Marisa Rodríguez Palop (2014–present)
 Paloma Gómez Borrero (1978–1983)
 Pedro Erquicia (1978–1984)
 Rosa María Calaf (1983–2009)
 Rosa María Molló (2003–2011)
 Sagrario Ruiz de Apodaca (2002–2003)
 Sagrario Garcia Masacaraque (2014–present)
 Maríà Oña (2014–2016)
 Marcos Lopez (2016–present)
 Yolanda Álvarez (2011–present)
 Nuria Ramos (2015–present)
 Vicenç Sanclemente (2015–present)
 Erika Reija (2015–present)
 Sandra Urdín (2014–2015)
 Íñigo Herráiz (2015–present)
 Yolanda Álvarez (2011–2015)
 Óscar Mijallo (2015–present)
 José Ramón Patterson (2015–present)
 Álvaro López de Goicoechea (2008–present)
 Cristina Olea (2018–present)

Weather forecasters 

 Mariano Medina (1957–1980)
 Manuel Toharia (1970–1980)
 Eugenio Martín Rubio (1968–1982)
 Pilar Sanjurjo (1979–1985)
 José Antonio Maldonado (1986–2008)
 Charo Pascual (1988–1990)
 Paco Montesdeoca (1990–2007)
 Albert Barniol (2005– )
 José Miguel Gallardo (2008– )
 Mònica López (2008–)
 Martín Barreiro (2010–)

Broadcast times
On weekdays, the programme is broadcast three times daily:
 06:30–08:30 CET/CEST Telediario Matinal
 15:00–16:00 CET/CEST Telediario 1
 21:00–22:00 CET/CEST Telediario 2

On Saturdays and Sundays Telediario Fin de Semana is broadcast at 15:00–16:00 and 21:00–22:00 (the same times as the weekday Telediario 1 and 2).

Occasionally, TVE may show a late-night edition of Telediario, named Telediario 3, which is typically aired between midnight and 03:00.

The 21:00 edition is broadcast head to head with the programme Antena 3 Noticias on former rival commercial network Antena 3. As of 2010, Telediario wins a larger audience share than Antena 3 Noticias. Since the removal of ads from TVE on 1 January 2010, Telediario lasts for more than sixty minutes, with El Tiempo adding about ten minutes more after it, and its audience continued to grow even more.

Territorial news bulletins
TVE's territorial centers in every autonomous community produce and broadcast in regional variations in each of them, a shorter midday local newscast, each one with a different name, following the format and visual identity of Telediario.

Legacy

In popular culture
The term Telediario in Spain has become synonymous with television news, with people saying 'put on the Telediario' when simply referring to news. "Le quedan dos telediarios" (he's got two news programmes left) is a common colloquial Spanish expression to suggest someone's days are numbered, either literally (about to die) or metaphorically (about to be removed from a position of responsibility).

In Equatorial Guinea
On 20 July 1968, Televisión Española inaugurated its territorial center in the Spanish autonomous region of Equatorial Guinea at Santa Isabel and began the first regular television broadcasts in the region. After Equatorial Guinea declared independence on 12 October 1968, the new authorities accused them of broadcasting "racist programming" and "imperialist propaganda", and TVE ended up closing the station. Shortly after they resumed their broadcasts as Televisión Nacional de Guinea Ecuatorial (TVGE) but they ceased broadcasting definitively in 1973 and the few remaining Spanish technicians left the country. The Equatoguinean government re-established TVGE in 1979. RTVE and the Government of Spain through development aid have helped to the development of the station on several occasions since then. TVGE's news bulletins are still branded under the name Telediario.

See also
 Los Desayunos de TVE
 Informe Semanal
 Antena 3 Noticias
 Informativos Telecinco

Notes

References

External links
 Videos of recent editions

1957 Spanish television series debuts
1950s Spanish television series
1960s Spanish television series
1970s Spanish television series
1980s Spanish television series
1990s Spanish television series
2000s Spanish television series
2010s Spanish television series
2020s Spanish television series
Spanish television news shows
RTVE shows
Flagship evening news shows
Spanish-language television shows